Cosmioconcha nitens, common name: the shiny dove shell, is a species of sea snail, a marine gastropod mollusk in the family Columbellidae, the dove snails.

Description
The size of an adult shell varies between 12 mm and 17 mm.

Distribution
This species occurs in the Gulf of Mexico and the Caribbean Sea; in the Atlantic Ocean off Brazil.

References

 Rosenberg, G., F. Moretzsohn, and E. F. García. 2009. Gastropoda (Mollusca) of the Gulf of Mexico, pp. 579–699 in Felder, D.L. and D.K. Camp (eds.), Gulf of Mexico–Origins, Waters, and Biota. Biodiversity. Texas A&M Press, College Station, Texas
 Pelorce J. (2017). Les Columbellidae (Gastropoda: Neogastropoda) de la Guyane française. Xenophora Taxonomy. 14: 4–21

External links
 

Columbellidae
Gastropods described in 1850